Helen Marden (born 1941) is an American artist. Marden, née Helen Harrington, was born in Pittsburgh and studied at Pennsylvania State University. Her work is included in the collections of the Whitney Museum of American Art and the Princeton University Art Museum.

References

Living people
20th-century American artists
20th-century American women artists
Pennsylvania State University alumni
Artists from Pittsburgh
1941 births
21st-century American women